László Sebestyén (born May 22, 1956) is a Hungarian engineer and politician, member of the National Assembly (MP) for Miskolc (Borsod-Abaúj-Zemplén County Constituency IV) between 2010 and 2014.

Sebestyén worked for the North Hungarian Regional Waterworks Ltd. since 1981. He became a member of the General Assembly of Miskolc during the 2006 local elections. After the 2010 parliamentary election he was appointed a member of the Parliamentary Committee on Sustainable Sevelopment on May 14, 2010. Sebestyén was defeated by Socialist MP László Varga in the 2014 parliamentary election, thus he lost his mandate.

References

1956 births
Living people
Hungarian engineers
Fidesz politicians
Members of the National Assembly of Hungary (2010–2014)
People from Miskolc